The Service of the Sword, published in 2003, was the fourth anthology of stories set in the Honor Harrington universe or Honorverse. The stories in the anthologies serve to introduce characters, provide deeper more complete backstory and flesh out the universe, so claim the same canonical relevance as exposition in the main series. David Weber, author of the mainline Honor Harrington series, serves as editor for the anthologies, maintaining fidelity to the series canons.

The book contains the following stories:
 "Promised Land" by Jane Lindskold
 Michael Winton, brother of Queen Elizabeth III and Crown Prince of Manticore, embarks on his "snotty" cruise following his studies at Saganami Naval Academy. Determined to prove that he can be more than the Heir to the Throne, Michael requests to be assigned to a ship on patrol deployment instead of a "safe" posting in the Manticoran home system. He is assigned to the light cruiser Intransigent, which is sent to the planet Masada on a diplomatic mission.
Meanwhile, Judith, a young Grayson girl captured by Masadan privateers and forced to marry their leader, becomes the greatest hope of a secret sisterhood of Masadan women who are plotting their escape from the religious fanatics of their world.
 With One Stone by Timothy Zahn
 The People's Republic of Haven tests a secret weapon. Bad news for them: their intended victim turns out to be Honor Harrington. Good news for Manticore: Honor's solution to the problem gives them a secret weapon of their own.
 "A Ship Named Francis" by John Ringo and Victor Mitchell
 Sean Tyler, a corpsman in the Royal Manticoran Navy, thought that a stint as a loaner in the explosively-growing Grayson Space Navy would boost his career. So, when there was a slot vacant on board the cruiser Francis Mueller, his wish was granted. Unfortunately for Corpsman Tyler, no one told him that almost everybody on board the Francis—from the clueless captain to the psychotic XO and the panicky chaplain—had been sent there because no one else in the entire Grayson Space Navy wants them.
 "Let's Go to Prague" by John Ringo
 A pair of Manticoran special forces operatives discover that a holiday can be even more fun if it involves spoiling StateSec's day.
 Fanatic by Eric Flint
 When the senior People's Commissioner assigned to a backwater sector of the People's Republic of Haven is found murdered, Oscar Saint-Just, now the dictator of Haven, sends a young and idealistic StateSec officer by the name of Victor Cachat to investigate. Confronting and terrorizing both Navy and StateSec personnel with his ruthlessness, Cachat orders broad reorganizations in the sector's military and security forces which may have more than "cleaning the house" in mind. But Cachat may be the right man in the right place at the right time when news of Saint-Just's overthrow reach his sector. Background for Crown of Slaves.
 The Service of the Sword by David Weber
 Abigail Hearns, the daughter of a prominent Grayson Steadholder, has grown up idolizing Honor Harrington ever since she witnessed her defense of Abigail's homeworld from the Masadans. Out of sheer determination, she attended Saganami Naval Academy to become the first Grayson midshipwoman. She is sent for her "snotty" cruise on board the heavy cruiser HMS Gauntlet, commanded by an irritating Manticoran nobleman who may be more than what he seems. But when Gauntlet is sent to investigate the disappearance of several ships in a backwater region of space, Abigail discovers that the Peeps are definitely not the only bad guys out there: background for The Shadow of Saganami.

External links 
 An excerpt of The Service of the Sword is available for download or reading online at the Baen Free Library here.

Science fiction anthologies
Honorverse books
2003 books